Impossible Cities: A Utopian Experiment is a play inspired by Italo Calvino's Invisible Cities and which deals with the fates of four different utopian communities in the United States. The play was staged by Walkabout Theater and premiered at Peter Jones Gallery. It grew out of a solo show by Seth Bockley, who also performs in the longer show.

One character, played by Jessica Hudson, works as a sort of master of ceremonies and narrates a number of chapters from Calvino's books. The four other performers in the play each discuss a single utopian experiment. Many of their speeches are autobiographical, and all deal explicitly with the relationship between the visions of the founders and the details of urban planning. Chloe Johnston discusses how the fortuitous discovery of a cookbook led to her interest in the Amana Colonies. Seth Zurer talks about life in Clarion, Utah, the site of an early twentieth-century Jewish experiment in rural living, an experiment in which his grandparents participated. Ira Murfin, in the most autobiographical segment, discusses Paolo Soleri's Arcosanti project in the Arizona desert. Seth Bockley takes up the life of, first, Joseph Smith and the history of Mormonism, especially in the community of Nauvoo, Illinois and, second, Etienne Cabet, a French socialist who brought hundreds of settlers to Nauvoo after the Mormons had been forced to leave.

Impossible Cities was recommended on the "Three to See" segment of Eight Forty-Eight, Chicago's public radio station WBEZ  It also was chosen to be part of "The Reader Recommends" in The Chicago Reader.

Bibliography
Adler, Tony. "Utopian States of America", Chicago Tribune, January 5, 2007. 
Lifson, Edward. "Three to See", Eight Forty-Eight, National Public Radio, January 4, 2007 
Weiss, Hedy. "Stage news & notes", Chicago Sun-Times, January 5, 2007

External links
Walkabout Theater homepage
Paul Metzger's page on his musical contributions
Peter Jones Gallery homepage

2007 plays
Plays based on novels
Plays set in the 19th century
Iowa in fiction
Utah in fiction
Jews and Judaism in fiction
Arizona in fiction
Illinois in fiction
Utopian movements
American plays
Plays set in the United States